Family Business is a French streaming television series created and directed by Igor Gotesman. The plot revolves around a failed entrepreneur, Joseph (Jonathan Cohen), who finds out that cannabis is about to be legalized in France. He consequently decides to change the family kosher butcher shop into the first marijuana coffeeshop in France.

The show was ordered direct-to-series, and the first season premiered on Netflix on 28 June 2019. It was quickly renewed for a second season in July 2019 and released on 11 September 2020. Netflix renewed the series for a third and final season, which was released on 8 October 2021.

Plot
Joseph wants to break out of his family's kosher butcher shop by starting a successful business, but has had little success. At a party, he and his best friend, Olivier, overhear an old and annoying friend, Clém, announce that France will soon legalise marijuana. Knowing Clém has a soft spot for Olivier, the two help her home while drunk and ask her for more information. Joseph decides to turn the butcher shop into a marijuana café and drives to the Netherlands to see how things operate there. His father, Gérard, is in the back of the van and they get high together, with Gérard indulging too much. However, Gérard does not want to change the family business. Joseph's sister, Aure, grandmother Ludmila, Olivier, and their friend Ali have to collect the men from the Netherlands. Ludmila has an old friend who is a grower in the Netherlands and buys some crops with her savings. Joseph, Aure, and friends come up with a plan to have Gérard's favourite musician, Enrico Macias, convince Gérard to agree to the plan. Enrico likes Joseph and Olivier's musical improvisations and agrees to help if they write an album with him. Meanwhile, Joseph has been paying little attention to his girlfriend, Ali's sister, Aïda.

With Gérard on board, the Hazan family looks to raise money to pay off Clém so that she will have her minister father process their marijuana café application first. Joseph approaches Youssef, Ali and Aïda's ex-convict older brother. The family owns an old farm in the countryside, and they move their crops to a barn there, disguising the operation as a meat processing plant. Shortly after their arrival, the police announce that they are using nearby fields for training. One officer, Élodie, becomes romantically interested in Aure, who starts dating her without telling the rest of the family.

A drug lord, Jaures, has claimed France as her turf, and comes to threaten the family, kidnapping Olivier. They agree to give her some of their product in exchange for his release. Their business becomes successful due to Ludmila's cultivation skills. Joseph names the strain "Pastraweed". Jaures later returns, kidnapping Joseph's children and telling them they need to quit growing; the family convinces her to let them continue if they grow for her. Gérard starts dating a woman named Catherine. Ludmila suffers a stroke, and Aure impersonates her grandmother to conceal her absence. Élodie notices and demands Aure tell her what is happening. The family accidentally kill Jaures in self defence, turning her body into sausages to hide it. Their grow operation finally busted, the men of the family get sent to prison. Aïda, a lawyer, begins to investigate. Other prisoners respect the creators of Pastraweed but also want drug-related favours in exchange for protection, including a business meeting with their dead boss, Jaures. The family convince Catherine to pretend to be Jaures, which she does very convincingly.

Just as they are about to be released, the men are broken out of prison and, with Aure and Ludmila, who have been kidnapped off the street, flown to a monastery in a foreign country. Ali works with his siblings, Clém, and Enrico to track down the family from Paris. Catherine turns out to be a rival drug lord and poses as another hostage in order to obtain information from the Hazans. Ludmila has recovered and is taken away to grow Pastraweed for the cartel. To stop their captors from killing them, Joseph and Olivier convince them they have also been developing magic mushrooms, which they found growing around the mouldy plumbing. High on hallucinogens, the boys accidentally escape their prison, but the local corrupt police eventually return them to the monastery. Catherine has really fallen for Gérard and decides to help them escape, having put her son in charge while she plays victim. Aïda gets the French police to organise a rescue mission, knowing Catherine's affiliations and working out where they are being held.

Cast and characters
 Jonathan Cohen as Joseph Hazan, a young man who desperately wants to escape working at his father's butcher shop
 Gérard Darmon as Gérard Hazan, Joseph's father, owner of a kosher butcher shop
 Julia Piaton as Aure Hazan, Joseph's sister
 Ali Marhyar as Ali Benkikir, Joseph's best friend
 Olivier Rosemberg as Olivier Pariente, an orphan raised by the Hazans.
 Liliane Rovère as Ludmila Rozenberg, Gérard's mother-in-law, Joseph and Aure's grandmother
 Louise Coldefy as Clémentine Cendron, an acquaintance of Joseph and Olivier
 Lina El Arabi as Aïda Benkikir, Ali's sister, Joseph's girlfriend, and Aure's best friend
 Tamar Baruch as Jaures, a drug boss
 Enrico Macias as Himself
 Ariane Mourier as Élodie, a gendarme
 Oussama Kheddam as Youssef Benkikir, Ali and Aïda's brother
 Alexandra Vandernoot as Catherine

Episodes

Season 1 (2019)

Season 2 (2020)

Season 3 (2021)

Reception
Cnaan Lipshiz in The Times of Israel and for the Jewish Telegraphic Agency wrote an overall positive review of the series and the way it explores French Jewish life, finding its comedy and premise similar to that of Breaking Bad. However, he felt the realist touches of the show were undermined by neglecting to explore relevant antisemitism in France as well as showing an uncommon friendship between the middle-class Jewish Hazan family and the working-class Muslim Benkakir family.

References

External links
 
 
 

French-language Netflix original programming
Television series about Jews and Judaism
Television shows set in France
Television shows set in Paris
2010s French comedy television series
2020s French comedy television series